Jan Hedl (born 9 January 1957, in Prague), known as Jan Sahara Hedl or simply Sahara, is a Czech singer-songwriter. Among his well-known hits are "Dívka a noc" and "Tisíc jmen".

In his childhood he played piano. At the high school, he met Martin Němec and later he founded his first band Duševní hrob with him. In 1982, he founded the band called Precedens together with Němec, who plays keyboards. Hedl left the band in 1984 and in 1994, he released his first solo album Tajnej svatej. In 1995, he released his second album Šílené pondělí, where Precedens served as backing band. His most recent album called Matka Zebra was released in 2001.

He is also lyricist for other artists, such as Luboš Pospíšil. He also wrote lyrics for Czech musicals Excalibur and Obraz Doriana Graye.

Discography
Tajnej svatej (1994)
Šílené pondělí (1995)
Matka Zebra (2001)

References

1957 births
Living people
21st-century Czech male singers
Czech guitarists
Male guitarists
Musicians from Prague
20th-century Czech male singers
Czechoslovak male singers